Cream City is an unincorporated community in Saline Township, Jefferson County, Ohio, United States.

References

Unincorporated communities in Jefferson County, Ohio